Anolis blanquillanus, the La Blanquilla anole or Hummelinck's anole, is a species of lizard in the family Dactyloidae. The species is found in Venezuela.

References

Anoles
Reptiles of Venezuela
Endemic fauna of Venezuela
Reptiles described in 1940